Fateless is a Hungarian film directed by Lajos Koltai, released in 2005. It is based on the semi-autobiographical novel Fatelessness by the Nobel Prize-winner Imre Kertész, who also wrote the screenplay. It tells the story of a teenage boy who is sent to Auschwitz and Buchenwald.

The film's music was composed by Ennio Morricone, and one of its songs was sung by Lisa Gerrard. The film is one of the most expensive movies ever produced in Hungary, with a cost of $12 million.

The film also features British actor Daniel Craig, who plays a cameo as a United States Army sergeant.

The film was screened in Hungary and Germany (at Berlinale), at the Telluride Film Festival in Telluride, Colorado as well as the Toronto International Film Festival.

Awards and nominations
 Nominated – Golden Berlin Bear – Lajos Koltai
 Nominated – European Film Award – Best Cinematographer – Gyula Pados
 Nominated – European Film Award – Best Composer – Ennio Morricone
 Official Selection – Berlin Film Festival 2005
 Official Selection – Telluride Film Festival 2005
 Official Selection – Karlovy Vary International Film Festival
 Gala Presentation – Edinburgh International Film Festival
 Special Presentation – Toronto International Film Festival
 Chicago International Film Festival 2005
 AFI Los Angeles Film Festival 2005

External links

References 

2005 films
2005 drama films
2000s English-language films
English-language German films
English-language Hungarian films
2000s German-language films
Holocaust films
2000s Hungarian-language films
Films based on Hungarian novels
Films scored by Ennio Morricone
British drama films
German multilingual films
Hungarian multilingual films
2005 multilingual films
German prison films
2000s British films
2000s German films